Bourvari is a collection of villages in Iran, between the city of Khomein (Markazi Province) and Aligoodarz (Lorestān Province).

Bourvari was mainly populated by Armenians who were brought to the region by Shah Abbas of the Safavid dynasty in 1603 and 1604.

The following is a list of villages, which were part of Bourvari:
Dehno
Khorzend
Farajabad
Bahmanabad
Sangesfid
Gharekariz
Goz

See also

 Armenians
 Armenian Diaspora
 New Julfa
 Ispahan
 Peria

Populated places in Lorestan Province
Armenian diaspora in the Middle East